Synthetoceras tricornatus is a large, extinct protoceratid, endemic to North America ( Nebraska ) during the Late Miocene, 10.3—5.3 Ma, existing for approximately . Fossils have been recovered from Nebraska and Texas.

Description 

It was also the last, and had what is considered to be the protoceratids' strangest set of horns. The two horns above its eyes looked fairly normal and similar to those of many modern horned mammals, but on its snout it had a bizarre, long horn with a forked tip that gave it a Y shape. Only males had this strange horn, and they probably used it in territorial fights.

References

Further reading 
 R. C. Hulbert and F. C. Whitmore. 2006. Late Miocene mammals from the Mauvilla Local Fauna, Alabama. Bulletin of the Florida Museum of Natural History 46(1):1-28
 Prothero D.R., 1998. Protoceratidae. pp. 431–438 in C.M. Janis, K.M. Scott, and L.L. Jacobs (eds.) Evolution of Tertiary Mammals of North America Cambridge University Press, Cambridge.

Protoceratids
Miocene even-toed ungulates
Serravallian first appearances
Messinian extinctions
Miocene mammals of North America
Hemphillian
Fossil taxa described in 1932
Prehistoric even-toed ungulate genera